William Enrique Palacios González (born 29 July 1994) is a Colombian footballer who last played as midfielder for Guatemalan club Deportivo Achuapa.

Career

Club career
In the early hours of 6 August 2017, along with Julián Quiñones, Palacios was involved in a bar fight in Puebla. The matter was under investigation which resulted in Palacios being waived for the remainder of his loan tenure at Lobos. As of 8 August, Lobos BUAP officially announced that Palacios would be released.

In January 2020, Palacios moved to Brazilian club Manaus Futebol Clube.

References

External links
 
 
 
 
 
 
 

1994 births
Living people
Association football midfielders
Colombian footballers
Colombian expatriate footballers
Categoría Primera A players
Liga MX players
Liga FPD players
Peruvian Primera División players
Paraguayan Primera División players
Primera Nacional players
Once Caldas footballers
Irapuato F.C. footballers
Jaguares de Córdoba footballers
Tigres UANL footballers
Independiente Santa Fe footballers
Atlético Huila footballers
Club Deportivo Universidad de San Martín de Porres players
Comerciantes Unidos footballers
Lobos BUAP footballers
Aldosivi footballers
Club Sol de América footballers
Club Celaya footballers
Independiente Medellín footballers
Manaus Futebol Clube players
Colombian expatriate sportspeople in Mexico
Colombian expatriate sportspeople in Peru
Colombian expatriate sportspeople in Costa Rica
Colombian expatriate sportspeople in Argentina
Colombian expatriate sportspeople in Paraguay
Colombian expatriate sportspeople in Brazil
Colombian expatriate sportspeople in Guatemala
Expatriate footballers in Mexico
Expatriate footballers in Peru
Expatriate footballers in Costa Rica
Expatriate footballers in Argentina
Expatriate footballers in Paraguay
Expatriate footballers in Brazil
Expatriate footballers in Guatemala
Sportspeople from Chocó Department